The African green toad (Bufotes boulengeri) is a species of toad found in North Africa from Western Sahara to Egypt, and on the Italian islands of Sicily, Favignana, Lampedusa and Ustica. The populations on the Italian islands were described as a separate species, the Sicilian green toad (B. siculus), in 2008, but more recent authorities treat it as a subspecies of the African green toad because they are very closely related. Both were historically included in the European green toad (B. viridis) and all have been included in the genus Bufo. It was previously suggested that the African green toad might range east into Sinai and the Levant, but a review has shown that this involves the related B. sitibundus. The African green toad is found from coastal areas to highland plateaus in forests, scrubland, grassland, semi-deserts and deserts; it breeds in temporary ponds and similar habitats.

In both size and colouration, the African green toad resembles other members of the genus Bufotes, including the European green toad and the Balearic green toad (B. balearicus). The range of the African and Balearic green toads approach each other in easternmost Sicily; only the latter species has coloured spots on the paratoid glands and some reddish-orange markings. The two subspecies of the African green toad very closely resemble each other; the North African B. b. boulengeri may differ from the Sicilian B. b. siculus by its dorsal stripe.

References

Bufotes
Amphibians of North Africa
Amphibians of Europe
Amphibians described in 1879